Bornetella nitida is a species of marine algae in the Dasycladaceae family. It is found throughout the Pacific Ocean, including Mauritius, Indonesia, Australia, and Japan.

References

Dasycladaceae